Kaisar may refer to:

 Band-e Kaisar
 Kaisar Jahan
 Kaisar Nurmaganbetov
 FC Kaisar
 Kaisar-i-Hind Medal
 Emperor of India
 , model and pendekar

See also 
 Kaiser (disambiguation)
 Kaiser-i-Hind (disambiguation)
 Qaisar